Henry Barry may refer to:

 Henry W. Barry (1840–1875), Union army officer and U.S. representative
 Henry Barry (British Army officer) (1750–1822), British Army officer
 Henry Deacon Barry (1849–1908), British Royal Navy officer
 Henry Barry, 4th Baron Barry of Santry (1710–1751), Irish peer

See also
 Thomas Henry Barry (1855–1919), U.S. Army general
 Harry Barry, Irish doctor
 Henry Berry (disambiguation)